Qabtar Qoluy-e Sofla (also Romanized as Qabţar Qolūy-e Soflá; also known as ‘Eyshūm Yek, Ghebté Gholooé Aval, Qabţaqolū, Qabţar Qolū-ye Soflá, Qeydar Qalū-ye Pā’īn, and Qeydar Qalū-ye Soflá) is a village in Zarqan Rural District, Zarqan District, Shiraz County, Fars Province, Iran. At the 2006 census, its population was 31, in 6 families.

References 

Populated places in Zarqan County